Don't Go (also titled Don't Let Go) is a 2018 psychological thriller from Irish writer/director David Gleeson, starring Stephen Dorff and Melissa George. The music was produced by Ferry Corsten.

Plot 
Struggling to come to terms with the tragic loss of Molly – their only child – Ben and Hazel Slater resolve to build a new life for themselves, renovating an idyllic hotel by the sea on Ireland's rugged west coast. But there is no escape, for the place is full of memories.

Haunted by the words 'Seas the day' which he sees everywhere and a recurring memory of a summer's day on the nearby beach when the family built sand castles topped with little red flags, Ben begins to realize that there are forces at work far beyond his understanding.

But what do those words mean? Could it be a childish misspelling of 'Seize the day'? Could this be a message from the other side?
When Ben wakes from one of the dreams with a tiny red flag in his hand, he becomes convinced that just as he seized the flag, he can also seize his little girl from the dream.
But nothing is ever so simple and when his wife's damaged best friend Serena arrives, Ben becomes terrified that the truth will be revealed ... The truth of how his daughter really died.

And as his grasp on reality begins to slip – as those around him begin to question his sanity – Ben becomes more determined than ever to solve this mystery and finally bring Molly home.

A determination which pays off as the pieces of the puzzle slot into place, giving Ben everything he ever wanted, but at a terrible price.

In his final dream, Ben realized what he had to do to bring Molly back. He finally remembered where he got his scar from. A boat named “Seas the Day” had hit him while he was swimming that day in the ocean, but he survived the accident. In an alternate universe version, he let himself get killed. That way, he would never have cheated on Hazel, Molly would not have walked into him and Serena and had the accident, and Serena would not have killed herself from guilt.

In the final scene, after Ben's funeral, Hazel is seen selling the house, and with the help of Serena, she and Molly are packing their things into the car. Her dog, however, ran back into the house and went upstairs. Hazel followed him into one of the rooms upstairs, where she found a tiny red flag on the windowsill.

Cast 
 Stephen Dorff as Ben Slater
 Melissa George as Hazel Slater
 Simon Delaney as Father Sean
 Aoibhinn McGinnity as Serena
 Grace Farrell as Molly
 Gavin O'Connor as Mr. Norton
 Lalor Roddy as Removal Man
 Des Cave as Uncle Frank
 Luke Griffin as Kieran
 Charlotte Bradley as Siobhan
 Sean Mahon as Dave Pearse
 Laurence O'Fuarain as Kevin Gunne

Filming 

The film  began shooting in An Spidéal, the west of Ireland on July 10, 2017, and wrapped after 22 days on August 4, 2017.

Release 

Don't Go was acquired for theatrical distribution in the US by IFC Films and opened in theaters on October 18, 2018. Don't Go opened in theaters across Ireland on April 12, 2019.

Reception 
The film received generally negative reviews. On Rotten Tomatoes it has an approval rating of  based on reviews from  critics. 
The New York Times labelled the film a "middling thriller" but called Dorff's performance "Strikingly enigmatic." The Los Angeles Times found the film "dry and dour" saying "This picture needs less moping and more spooking." Rex Reed panned the film saying the script was "too slow for its own good."

References

2018 films
English-language Irish films